Facelina is a genus of sea slug, an aeolid nudibranch in the family Facelinidae.

Species
Species within the genus Facelina include:

 Facelina annulata Macnae, 1954 
 Facelina annulicornis (Chamisso & Eysenhardt, 1821)
 Facelina auriculata (Müller, 1776) - synonyms: Facelina coronata Facelina bilineata Hirano & Ito, 1998
 Facelina bostoniensis (Couthouy, 1838)
 Facelina carmelae Moro & Ortea, 2015
 Facelina coenda Er. Marcus, 1958
 Facelina dubia (Pruvot-Fol, 1948)
 Facelina fragilis (Risbec, 1928)
 Facelina fusca Schmekel 1966
 Facelina goslingii A. E. Verrill, 1901
 Facelina hartleyi Burn, 1962
 Facelina lineata Eliot, 1905
 Facelina lugubris (Bergh, 1882)
 Facelina newcombi (Angas, 1864)
 Facelina olivacea Macnae, 1954
 Facelina quadrilineata (Baba, 1930)
 Facelina rhodopos Yonow, 2000
 Facelina rubrovittata (Costa A., 1866)
 Facelina rutila Pruvot-Fol, 1951
 Facelina schwobi (Labbé, 1923)
 Facelina vicina (Bergh, 1882)
 Facelina zhejiangensis Lin & You, 1990

Species brought into synonymy
 Facelina agari Smallwood, 1910: synonym of Berghia agari (Smallwood, 1910)
 Facelina coronata (Forbes & Goodsir, 1839): synonym of Facelina auriculata (Müller, 1776) - type species of Facelina Facelina marioni Vayssière, 1888: synonym of Facelinopsis marioni (Vayssière, 1888)
 Facelina plumosa (Fleming, 1828): synonym of Facelina auriculata (Müller, 1776)
 Facelina quatrefagesi Vayssière, 1888: synonym of Caloria quatrefagesi (Vayssière, 1888)
 Facelina sargassicola Bergh, 1861: synonym of Spurilla sargassicola Bergh, 1871
 Facelina stearnsi: synonym of  Austraeolis stearnsi (Cockerell, 1901)
 Facelina variegata d'Oliveira, 1895: synonym of Berghia verrucicornis (A. Costa, 1867)

 References 

Further reading
 
 Vaught, K.C. (1989). A classification of the living Mollusca. American Malacologists: Melbourne, FL (United States). . XII, 195 pp.
 Gofas, S.; Le Renard, J.; Bouchet, P. (2001). Mollusca, in: Costello, M.J. et al. (Ed.) (2001). European register of marine species: a check-list of the marine species in Europe and a bibliography of guides to their identification. Collection Patrimoines Naturels, 50: pp. 180–213
 Rolán E., 2005. Malacological Fauna From The Cape Verde Archipelago. Part 1, Polyplacophora and Gastropoda.''

Facelinidae
Gastropod genera